Horst Mayer (born 24 September 1945 in Schlenzer) is a German former wrestler who competed in the 1968 Summer Olympics and in the 1972 Summer Olympics.

References

External links
 

1945 births
Living people
Olympic wrestlers of East Germany
Wrestlers at the 1968 Summer Olympics
Wrestlers at the 1972 Summer Olympics
German male sport wrestlers